Yusmarg or Yousmarg (یوسمرگ) (meaning 'Meadow of Jesus') is a hill station in the  western part of the Budgam district of Jammu and Kashmir, India. Yousmarg provides space for beautiful landscapes, young pine nurseries, green pastures and heart touching lotic and lentic water bodies. Nilnag, Doodhganga and a nascently created  artificial dam adds more to the beauty of the meadows. Nature has bestowed Yusmarg with pleasant flora and fauna. Yusmarg is often referred to as a trekkers paradise.Yusmarg has some modest stay options but some new homestays have come up around the area.Tribe homestay and cafes located at the nearest village Nagbal are gaining popularity especially among the youth. The place is rustic, wooden and reflects the Kashmiri architectural heritage. Among fauna, locals claim that they often sight wolves, bears, apes, cats, aves of various  types (flight as well as flightless). Among aquatic fauna, schizothoraxic is abundant one in catch.

Geography
Yusmarg in Kashmiri translates to The Meadow of Jesus. It is said to have been visited by Jesus. It is an alpine valley covered with snow clad mountains and the meadows of Pine and Fir. It is situated at the bank of Doodganga River which is a tributary of Jehlum River. It is located in the Pir Panjal  peaks, a sub range of Himalaya. The Peaks are: the Sunset Peak and the Tatakooti Peak for which the expeditions lead from this hill station.

Tourism
A trek of 4 km leads to a small lake called Nilnag, famous for its blue water. 10 km trek leads to the frozen lake in Sang-e-Safed valley, which is mostly covered by ice even during the summer. Other tourist activities include horse riding, fishing, skiing during winter and photography.

Access
Yusmarg is easily accessed from Srinagar or Srinagar Airport (SXR), the capital of Jammu and Kashmir, 47 km. The drive in under 2 hours by car or bus leads through Charari Sharief town.

COVID-19
During COVID-19, teachers of High school Kandajan in Yusmarg area started open-air community classes in order to make up for the losses due to the pandemic.

See also
 Sonamarg
 Gulmarg
 Pahalgam
 Aharbal

References

External links
Yusmarg
Yusmarg Travel Guide

Cities and towns in Budgam district
Hill stations in Jammu and Kashmir
Ahmadiyya